"Operation Kilt" is an episode in the British comedy series Dad's Army. It was originally transmitted on Saturday 1 March 1969.

Synopsis
The platoon have to defend the church hall from a platoon of Highlanders on an exercise.

Plot
Captain Mainwaring leads the platoon in required PT exercises, injuring himself in the process and being briefly interrupted by Mrs Pike, who brings a rifle bolt Private Pike left at home and that she cleaned in the sink. Captain Ogilvie of the Highland Unit then arrives to inform them that they are to participate in a training exercise where the Highlanders will attempt to capture the Platoon's headquarters, starting at 10pm tomorrow. A complicated system of paints will be used to mark the dead, wounded, captured and so on. Ogilvie is dismissive of the group's competency as soldiers and punches Pike in the stomach to test him – only to recoil in pain while Pike doesn't even flinch.  After Ogilvie leaves, it turns out he punched Pike's rifle bolt (which he put down his vest earlier).

The platoon decide to sneak into the Highlanders' headquarters at a local farm to spy on them, so Private Walker and Private Frazer 'borrow' a pantomime cow costume. Mainwaring dismisses the idea, insisting it won't work, but Walker and Frazer decide to try anyway – only to return bruised and battered after running into a bull. Sergeant Wilson then suggests a Trojan Horse, with a haycart containing a platoon member being placed at the farm. After Pike turns out to have hayfever, Lance Corporal Jones acts as the spy and discovers that the Highlanders plan to start early and sneak through the woods to get to Walmington-on-Sea.

Early that night, Mainwaring leads the platoon in rigging all the paths through the woods with man traps inspired by a Tarzan film.  Seven traps work, but when Jones goes to lead the last man in the eighth trap, he gets caught himself.  As the platoon rescue him, they find themselves at the mercy of Captain Ogilvie, the last free member of the Highland Unit. Declaring that they are now all 'dead', Ogilvie goes to snatch their paint, only to blunder into the man trap. Mainwaring and Wilson are disgusted as they suddenly discover what Scotsmen REALLY wear under their kilts.

Cast

Arthur Lowe as Captain Mainwaring
John Le Mesurier as Sergeant Wilson
Clive Dunn as Lance Corporal Jones
John Laurie as Private Frazer
James Beck as Private Walker
Arnold Ridley as Private Godfrey
Ian Lavender as Private Pike
Janet Davies as Mrs Pike
James Copeland as Captain Ogilvie
Colin Daniels as Small Boy

Notes
This programme was formerly one of the missing Dad's Army episodes and was thought to be irretrievably lost for many years. However, in June 2001 this episode and The Battle of Godfrey's Cottage were returned to the BBC. The film cans were in a poor condition and the film itself had seriously deteriorated. Following restoration by BBC technicians, it was repeated.
The second series was scheduled originally to be broadcast in January 1969. Instead, the BBC decided to repeat the first series in January 1969 because they believed many people had missed the series when it had started in the summer of 1968.

References

External links

Dad's Army radio episodes
Dad's Army (series 2) episodes
1969 British television episodes
Rediscovered television